The Countess of Monte Cristo  is a 1948 American comedy film directed by Fred de Cordova and starring Sonja Henie, Olga San Juan and Dorothy Hart. The film was distributed by Universal Pictures. It was Henie's last dramatic feature film.

Plot
Right before closing time Karen Kirsten and Jenny Johnsen, who work as waitresses at an Oslo night club, get an offer from the National Studios assistant director Jensen. He promises to make them both famous, and wants to give them screen test auditions. They accept the offer, and the very next day the girls show up at the film studio to try out for roles in the company's new production "Countess of Monte Cristo". There are two roles available: the countess herself and her maid.

However, the director, Mr. Hansen, manages to insult the young women gravely, and they leave the studios in anger, taking one of the studio's fancy cars as their ride while still wearing the costumes from the production. They drive to the luxurious Hotel Trollheimen, and use the costumes to lure the management into thinking they really are a countess and her maid. On the outside they encounter army Lt. Paul Von Cram, who is so captivated by their appearance - especially Karen's - that he offers to carry their suitcases up to their hotel suite. Because of this the two women mistake Paul for a bellboy.

Paul decides to cancel his imminent date with socialite woman Peg Manning, since he now has his eyes set on Karen. He then sends Karen a note at the hotel, asking her to meet "a lieutenant" at the hotel bar. Karen is intrigued by this and has no idea that it is Paul she is meeting. She makes a makeshift dress out of the curtains in the suite and goes down to meet the lieutenant. Arriving at the bar she instantly realises her earlier mistake.

Jenny discovers that they have been listed as thieves and wanted refugees from the law in a newspaper article. In a desperate attempt to hide this from the people at the hotel she buys every available newspaper she can find.

When the police enters the suite the next morning, the two women are surprised, since instead of arresting them, the police informs them that a known thief has stolen from other guests at the same hotel during the night. The hotel manager also wants them to make a list of their belongings, to see if something is missing and possibly replace it. Karen and Jenny discuss what they are to put on their "shopping list", when the thief, Count Holgar, reveals himself to them. Holgar has been hiding in their room while the police searched the hotel.

It turns out Holgar has seen the newspaper article and the photos of Karen and Jenny. He blackmails them to put additional items on their list of lost belongings to get him some money. If they don't do what he says he will reveal their true identities to the hotel management. He also wants them to follow him to the other side of the country to pull the same trick in another hotel, since he thinks the idea is brilliant. Karen and Jenny are horrified by what they have gotten into, but can see no way out of the fix at the moment. They get new belongings from the hotel management and go outside to try and come up with a plan.

When they are at an ice-skating rink they bump into Paul and Peg. Paul, still smitten by Karen, asks her to join him on the ice, and lets go of the offended Peg. Karen and Paul are so good at skating together that they win a tryout to the big ice show the very next day. Karen is infatuated by Paul and after he gives her a small token of affection, a simple brooch without real value he claims to have inherited, they kiss.

When Karen returns to the hotel Holgar sees the brooch and recognizes it instantly. He claims it has been part of the famous Von Havenmeier jewel collection. Holgar assumes Paul has stolen the brooch but doesn't tell the girls about his suspicions. He just makes them promise to leave the rink right after the ice show, since they must be on their way. 

The police finds out that Karen and Jenny are frauds living at the hotel, and that the thief Holgar is with them. They inform the hotel manager, but he agrees to let them perform at the highly popular ice show before they are arrested. The women decide to escape together with Holgar before the show ends. Karen talks to Paul and tells him to meet up with them.

In the evening Karen and Paul perform at the ice show. Jensen and Hansen are also attending the show and scouting for talent. When they see Karen they consider her their new big star. During a short pause in the show, Karen and Holgar meet Paul. The two men get into a dispute and Paul chases Holgar away, threatening to beat him up.

Paul confesses to Karen that he is no jewel thief, but the true heir to Von Havenmeier and the family fortune. The police arrive to arrest Karen, but Paul convinces them the whole set-up was a publicity stunt for the release of the studio's latest film. He offers to pay the bills the women have worked up. Paul then admits to Karen that he was on to her from the very beginning. He tells her that he loves her, and they finish the ice show, skating together.

Cast
 Sonja Henie as Karen Kirsten
 Olga San Juan as Jenny Johnsen
 Dorothy Hart as Peg Manning
 Michael Kirby as Lt. Paul Von Cram
 Arthur Treacher as Hotel Managing Director
 Hugh French as Count Holgar
 Ransom M. Sherman as Mr. Hansen
 Freddie Trenkler as Skating Specialty
 John James as Freddie
 Arthur O'Connell as Assistant Director Jensen
 Joseph Crehan as Joe
 Ray Teal as Charlie
 unbilled players include Bess Flowers and Gino Corrado

Production
In December 1943 Henie signed a deal with the newly formed International Pictures to make It's a Pleasure. In November 1944, in between when It's a Pleasure was filmed and released, International announced they would make a second film with Henie, The Countess of Monte Cristo, based on a story by Walter Reisch with a script by George Beck and Frank Tarloff.  The same month International announced that Marie McDonald, who had been in It's a Pleasure, had been signed to a one film a year contract for five years and would be in the film. In January 1945 Walter Thompson was announced producer.

In March 1945 International announced that William Seiter would direct and Dennis O'Keefe would co star. The following month Frank Veloz signed to do dance direction.

The project ended up being postponed. It was reactivated when International merged with Universal. In October 1947 Universal announced they would make the film. In November Andrew Stone was attached to direct.

In December Universal said they would distribute the movie, which would be made by Westwood Productions, a new company formed by John Beck and Henie. Susannah Foster was going to co star with Henie and filming was to begin in March 1948. William Bowers did a rewrite on the script.

In May filming shut down for a week as director Andrew Stone was replaced by Frederick de Cordova. The reason given was that Stone fell ill.

The movie used background footage taken in Norway which had originally been shot for a film Song of Norway that was postponed.

Reception
The Los Angeles Times said "the choice of plot material is inappropriate."

Filmink magazine called it "A surprising delight. Olga San Juan is terrific. Breezy, fun, silly."

See also
 The Countess of Monte Cristo (1932)
 The Countess of Monte Cristo (1934)
 Just Once a Great Lady (1957)

References

External links

The Countess of Monte Cristo at BFI
The Countess of Monte Cristo at Letterbox DVD
Review of film at Variety

1948 films
1948 comedy films
American comedy films
1940s English-language films
Films directed by Frederick de Cordova
Universal Pictures films
Films set in hotels
Films set in Norway
Films about con artists
Figure skating films
American remakes of German films
Remakes of American films
Films scored by Walter Scharf
Publicity stunts in fiction
American black-and-white films
1940s American films